Oleksandr Ihnatyev (born 23 June 1971) is a former Ukrainian football forward.

References

External links
 

1971 births
Living people
Footballers from Kyiv
Ukrainian footballers
Soviet footballers
FC Tyumen players
FC Nyva Vinnytsia players
FC Polissya Zhytomyr players
FC Ros Bila Tserkva players
FC Khimik Severodonetsk players
FC CSKA Kyiv players
FC Slavutych players
FC Nyva Myronivka players
FC Oleksandriya players
FC Lukhovitsy players
FC Dnipro Kyiv players
Ukrainian Premier League players
Ukrainian expatriate footballers
Expatriate footballers in Russia
Ukrainian Cup top scorers
Ukrainian football managers
SC Chaika Petropavlivska Borshchahivka managers
Association football forwards